José Horacio Lugo (born May 27, 1966) is a former Argentine football player, he played for more than 15 years, and after retiring moved to Richmond, Virginia.

He is the former Director of Player Development at Chesterfield United Soccer Club. Currently he is the Head Director of We Are Futbol. He is currently back in his home country after 17 years.

Professional awards and achievements

2nd Place in the Copa Chile with Deportes Concepción (Chile).
National Champions with Alianza F.C (El Salvador).
Champions of Central America with Alianza F.C (El Salvador).
Best Foreign Player (1993) in Chile.
Best Forward (1997) in El Salvador.
Best Foreign Player (1997) in El Salvador.
Participation in VCU soccer program
Holder of NSCAA National License

External links
Lugo bio

Living people
Footballers from Buenos Aires
Argentine footballers
Chacarita Juniors footballers
Club Atlético Los Andes footballers
Club Deportivo Palestino footballers
Deportes Concepción (Chile) footballers
Alianza F.C. footballers
Aurora F.C. players
Deportivo Zacapa players
Argentine expatriate sportspeople in Chile
Expatriate footballers in Chile
Expatriate footballers in Guatemala
Expatriate footballers in El Salvador
1965 births
Association football forwards
Argentine expatriate sportspeople in Guatemala
Argentine expatriate sportspeople in El Salvador